South Kanara (South) Lok Sabha constituency was a former Lok Sabha constituency in Madras State.  This seat came into existence in 1951. With the implementation of States Reorganisation Act, 1956, it ceased to exist.

Assembly segments
South Kanara (South) Lok Sabha constituency comprised the following six Legislative Assembly segments:
 Panamangalore (Panemangalore)
 Mangalore
 Puttur (2 seats)
 Kasaragod
 Kanhangad

After South Canara District of erstwhile Madras State got merged with Mysore State in 1956, this seat ceased to exist and was replaced by Mangalore Lok Sabha constituency. The Parts of Kasargod and Hosdurg (Kanhangad) were merged with Kerala and became a part of Kasaragod Lok Sabha constituency.

Members of Parliament 
Madras State: (as South Kanara (South))
1952: B. Shiva Rao, Indian National Congress
Mysore State: (as Mangalore)
1957: K. R. Achar, Indian National Congress
1962: Adhur Shanker Alva, Indian National Congress
1967: Cheppudira Muthana Poonacha, Indian National Congress
1971: K. K. Shetty, Indian National Congress
Karnataka (as Mangalore)
1977: Janardhana Poojary, Indian National Congress
1980: Janardhana Poojary, Indian National Congress (Indira)
1984: Janardhana Poojary, Indian National Congress
1989: Janardhana Poojary, Indian National Congress
1991: Venur Dhananjaya Kumar, Bharatiya Janata Party
1996: Venur Dhananjaya Kumar, Bharatiya Janata Party
1998: Venur Dhananjaya Kumar, Bharatiya Janata Party
1999: Venur Dhananjaya Kumar, Bharatiya Janata Party
2004: Devaragunda Venkappa Sadananda Gowda, Bharatiya Janata Party

See also
 Dakshina Kannada district
 Kasargod district
 Kasaragod Lok Sabha constituency
 List of former constituencies of the Lok Sabha
 Mangalore Lok Sabha constituency
 South Kanara (North) Lok Sabha constituency
 Udupi district

Notes

Dakshina Kannada district
Politics of Kasaragod district
Former constituencies of the Lok Sabha
1956 disestablishments in India
Constituencies disestablished in 1956
South Kanara District
Former Lok Sabha constituencies of Karnataka